Western Stores and Edgleys Ltd. was a group of department stores operating in Western and Central Western New South Wales in Australia. 

The companies were purchased by Farmers & Coy. of Sydney in the 1960s. Shortly after that, Farmers were purchased by Myer Emporium.

Locations 
(Not exhaustive)

 Dubbo - head office
 Bathurst
 Canowindra
 Cessnock
 Cowra (was Squire Pepper, acquired 1955)
 Geurie
 Grenfell
 Gilgandra
 Molong (was L. A. Nancarrow, acquired 1938)
 Narromine
 Orange
 Parkes
 Penrith
 Tamworth
 Trangie
 Tweed Heads
 Wellington
 Wongarbon

References

Defunct department stores of Australia
Defunct retail companies of Australia